Ust-Sukhoyaz (Hikeyaźtamaq) is a rural locality (a village) in Karayarsky Selsoviet, Karaidelsky District, Bashkortostan, Russia. The population was 27 as of 2010. There is 1 street.

Geography 
Ust-Sukhoyaz is located 29 km southeast of Karaidel (the district's administrative centre) by road. Komsomolsky is the nearest rural locality.

References 

Rural localities in Karaidelsky District